
Gmina Kulesze Kościelne is a rural gmina (administrative district) in Wysokie Mazowieckie County, Podlaskie Voivodeship, in north-eastern Poland.

Villages
Gmina Kulesze Kościelne contains the villages and settlements of Chojane-Bąki, Chojane-Gorczany, Chojane-Pawłowięta, Chojane-Piecki, Chojane-Sierocięta, Chojane-Stankowięta, Czarnowo-Biki, Faszcze, Gołasze Mościckie, Gołasze-Dąb, Grodzkie Szczepanowięta, Kalinowo-Solki, Kulesze Kościelne, Kulesze Podlipne, Kulesze-Litewka, Kulesze-Podawce, Leśniewo-Niedźwiedź, Niziołki-Dobki, Nowe Grodzkie, Nowe Kalinowo, Nowe Wiechy, Nowe Wykno, Stara Litwa, Stare Grodzkie, Stare Kalinowo, Stare Niziołki, Stare Wykno, Stypułki-Giemzino, Tybory Uszyńskie, Wnory-Pażochy, Wnory-Wiechy and Wnory-Wypychy.

Neighbouring gminas
Gmina Kulesze Kościelne is bordered by the gminas of Kobylin-Borzymy, Kołaki Kościelne, Rutki, Sokoły and Wysokie Mazowieckie.

References

External links
Polish official population figures 2006

Kulesze Koscielne
Wysokie Mazowieckie County